The Shiromani Akali Dal (Sanyukt) (SAD(S)) (translation: Supreme Akali Party (United)) is a centre-right Sikh-centric political party in Punjab, India, formed by former Shiromani Akali Dal leaders Sukhdev Singh Dhindsa and Ranjit Singh Brahmpura.

The party was formed in April 2021 by the merger of two political parties of Punjab Shiromani Akali Dal (Taksali) and Shiromani Akali Dal (Democratic). Notable leaders include Ranjit Singh Talwandi, Harsukhinder Singh Bubby Badal, Manmohan Singh Sathiala, Parminder Singh Dhindsa, Paramjit Kaur Gulshan, Harjit Kaur Talwandi and Des Raj Dhugga.

Overview
Shiromani Akali Dal (Sanyukt) is formed with the merger of Shiromani Akali Dal (Democratic) formed by Sukhdev Singh Dhindsa in 2020 and Shiromani Akali Dal (Taksali) by Ranjit Singh Brahmpura in 2018. Both formed their faction parties after they left the Shiromani Akali Dal (Badal). The party will contest 2022 Punjab Legislative Assembly election with like-minded parties in Punjab.

On 22 June 2021 Party made its first expansion by announcing Paramjit Kaur Gulshan as Patron and Harjit Kaur Talwandi as President of Women's wing and Des Raj Singh Dhugga as President of its Schedule Caste's wing and party also named 24 Districts Presidents.

List of President

See also
 2022 Punjab Legislative Assembly election

References

Political parties in Punjab, India
2021 establishments in Punjab, India
Shiromani Akali Dal (Taksali)
Political parties established in 2021
Sikh political parties